Surendra is a genus of butterflies in the family Lycaenidae. It belongs to the subfamily Theclinae often called hairstreaks. It is often grouped into the tribe Arhopalini along with its sister genera Arhopala, Flos and Semanga. The genus is sometimes known by the common name acacia blues in reflection of the host plant of the larvae.

Species
Surendra quercetorum (Moore, 1857)
Surendra vivarna (Horsfield, 1829)
Surendra florimel Doherty, 1889
Surendra manilana (C. & R. Felder, 1862)

Range
The species resides in Sri Lanka, India, China, Indochina, Malay Peninsula, Sumatra, Java, Bali, Borneo, Philippines and  Sulawesi.

References

Arhopalini
Lycaenidae genera
Taxa named by Frederic Moore